Aequispirella bifurcata is an extinct species of sea snail, a marine gastropod mollusk, unassigned in the superfamily Seguenzioidea.

Distribution
Fossils of this marine species were found in New Zealand.

References

 bifurcata
Gastropods described in 1992